Vojsko may refer to several villages in Slovenia: 

Vojsko, Idrija
Vojsko, Kozje
Vojsko, Vodice